My Friend Flicka is a western television series about a boy and his horse Flicka – a Swedish name meaning "little girl". The series is based on the novels by Mary O'Hara and the 1943 film My Friend Flicka. Though filmed in color, it was originally shown on CBS in black-and-white from February 10, 1956 until August 1957. Only one season of the popular series was filmed, but was broadcast in syndicated reruns for many years, starting in September 1957 on NBC.

Synopsis
The series takes place around 1900 on the fictional Goose Bar Ranch near Coulee Springs, Wyoming. Gene Evans played horse rancher Rob McLaughlin, Anita Louise was his wife Nell McLaughlin, and Johnny Washbrook played their son Ken. Frank Ferguson was their ranch hand Gus Broeberg, and Pamela Beaird had a recurring role as Hildy Broeberg, the niece of Gus. Stories dealt with the struggles of earning a living as a rancher, and problems that neighbors and friends encountered. Each adventure centered around young Ken and his horse Flicka. Sometimes Ken's wrong choices caused problems, but the series taught the importance of learning from your mistakes. Rob would tell the youngster: "You did what you thought was right son, and that's the important thing".

Production
Interior shots were filmed on the old William Fox Motion Pictures Studio, and exterior locations were at the 20th Century Fox Movie Ranch, which is now part of Malibu Creek State Park.

The series had higher-than-average production costs, with the finest camera work and other technical attributes. At a time when most viewers owned black-and-white televisions My Friend Flicka was filmed in color, though it was originally broadcast in black-and-white.

During the 1950s it was common practice to have one advertiser sponsor an entire season of a television series. CBS was asking an advertising fee of $37,500 for each episode, and at least one advertiser chose to sponsor a different series, which was $10,000 less expensive per episode. Colgate-Palmolive signed on as the series sponsor.

High production costs is believed to be the reason why the popular series did not have a second season. Instead, 20th Century-Fox chose My Friend Flicka as one of the first two series that they offered as rerun syndication packages.

Broadcast history
From February 10, 1956 to February 1957 CBS broadcast My Friend Flicka on Fridays from 7:30 to 8:00 p.m., and in March it was shown on Saturdays from 7:00 to 7:30 p.m. From April to May it was on Sundays from 6:00 to 6:30 p.m., and from June to August it was shown on Wednesdays from 7:30 to 8:00 p.m. The series moved to NBC, where it aired in color for the first time. From September to December it was broadcast on Sundays from 6:30 to 7:00 p.m., and from January to May 1958 it was shown on Sundays from 7:00 to 7:30 p.m.

During the 1959 - 1960 television season ABC broadcast the series weekdays during the late afternoon. My Friend Flicka then moved to Saturday afternoons. During the 1961 - 1962 season it was broadcast on CBS, it was on ABC from September 1962 to December 1963, and it returned to CBS from September 1964 to September 1966.

Episodes

Additional boy and his horse TV westerns
 The Adventures of Champion
 Fury

References

External links
 My Friend Flicka fan site

Television series about horses
1950s Western (genre) television series
1950s American children's television series
1956 American television series debuts
1958 American television series endings
English-language television shows
Television shows set in Wyoming